Everfree is a science fiction novel by American writer Nick Sagan, published in 2006. It is the sequel to Edenborn and the final installment of this trilogy.

Plot summary
A plague has wiped out most of humanity.  The only ones that have survived are the genetically engineered "posthumans" and a group of wealthy people that preserved themselves cryogenically.

Reception
The New York Times states the book would've been better if he stayed with the character Hal as the narrator, and not mostly relied on others they called "flakier"
Publishers Weekly states "so much is going on and flying off in so many directions, that the book finally reads like a tantalizing summary of a really interesting novel."

References

External links
Official site

American science fiction novels
2006 science fiction novels
2006 American novels
Year of work missing